Dalga Luka is a village in Tran Municipality in western Bulgaria. Dalga Luka is situated at about 850 meters above sea level.

Villages in Pernik Province